Damien McCaul is an Irish radio presenter and  television personality.

Career
McCaul used to present The Den, RTÉ's nationwide programming for children, where he worked alongside Dustin the Turkey for many years before quitting in May 2003.

McCaul later joined Classic Hits 4FM on their weekend show All Request Weekend.</ref> During this time he purchased a home in Glasnevin.

Counselor
McCaul is a licensed Counsellor & Psychotherapist at FSN (Finglas Support and Suicide Prevention Network).

References

1970s births
Living people
Alumni of Dublin Institute of Technology
Dublin's Q102 presenters
Dublin's 98FM presenters
RTÉ 2fm presenters
The Den (TV programme) presenters
Mass media people from Dublin (city)